Stolbovoy is a rural locality (a settlement) in Aktyubinsky Selsoviet of Volodarsky District, Astrakhan Oblast, Russia. The population was 128 as of 2010. There are 2 streets.

Geography 
Stolbovoy is located on the Krivaya Srednyaya River, 12 km northwest of Volodarsky (the district's administrative centre) by road. Kostyube is the nearest rural locality.

References 

Rural localities in Volodarsky District, Astrakhan Oblast